Phlegar Farm is a historic home located near Floyd, Floyd County, Virginia.  The original log dwelling was built in 1816, and later expanded about 1857 and about 1910. The house is two-stories with a metal sheathed gable roof, weatherboard siding, a stone gable-end chimney, two one-story front porches, and a one-story ell. The interior has Federal and Greek Revival style details. Also on the property are a contributing granary and workshop.

It was listed on the National Register of Historic Places in 2003.

References

Houses on the National Register of Historic Places in Virginia
Houses completed in 1816
Federal architecture in Virginia
Greek Revival houses in Virginia
Houses in Floyd County, Virginia
National Register of Historic Places in Floyd County, Virginia
1816 establishments in Virginia